Ben Massarella is an American percussionist and drummer. He is a member of Califone, a former member of Red Red Meat, Loftus, and Orso, and co-founded Perishable Records with Tim Rutili in 1993.

He contributed percussion to Modest Mouse's 2000 album  The Moon & Antarctica, 2015 album Strangers to Ourselves, and 2021 album The Golden Casket.  He has consistently toured with the band since 2014. Previously, Massarella toured for many years with Iron & Wine and contributed percussion to the 2011 album Kiss Each Other Clean.

References

living people
year of birth missing (living people)